The Autonomous Port of Dakar (French: Port autonome de Dakar, abbreviation: PAD) is a Senegalese public enterprise which is headquartered in Dakar, located in the east of city. Thanks to the strategic position that gives it a sheltered harbor, it is now the third largest port in West Africa after the Autonomous Port of Abidjan and the Port of Lagos It is also the ninth-largest port on the African continent.

The port has one of the largest deep-water seaports along the West African coast. Its deep-draft structure and  access channel allows round-the-clock access to the port. Its current infrastructure includes tanker vessel loading and unloading terminals, a container terminal with a storage capacity of 3000 20-foot-equivalent units, a cereals and fishing port, a dedicated phosphate terminal and a privately run ship repair facility. The port's location at the extreme western point of Africa, at the crossroad of the major sea-lanes linking Europe to South America, makes it a natural port of call for shipping companies.

Nearby over 10 km west of the port is Les Mamelles Lighthouse (also the Ouakam Lighthouse) in which the port maintains together with its beacons.

History 

Led by Captain Protet, French troops took possession of the Senegalese coast in 1857. Work began on the port in 1862 and it was inaugurated in 1866.

In the late 1880s up to the Great Depression in the early 1930s (thought did not fully affected inland in Senegal), its ship traffic volume was high, it was used as a refueling station for ships with coal, especially military ones, up to the start of the 20th century, most of the ships were French, other ships came there.  Ship volume was always higher than the port of Mindelo (see also Porto Grande Bay) in Portuguese Cape Verde, the closest other major port at the time and was nearly active with the port of Las Palmas de Gran Canaria.  Coal refueling dropped when diesel ships rose and by the late 1950s, all ships would be refueled with diesel.

While the Bolloré Group was in Senegal for more than 80 years, Dubai Ports World (DP World), who on October 8, 2007 signed an agreement with Senegalese Prime Minister Cheikh Hadjibou Soumaré for a 25-year concession on the container terminal of the port, marking a new breakthrough business in the Gulf States in Francophone Africa, ahead of the 11th summit of the Organization of the Islamic Cooperation in Dakar in March 2008.

Plans for new infrastructure - modernization of the site and the "future of the port", as stated by President Abdoulaye Wade - are scheduled for delivery by 2012.

Activity
Total freight traffic averages 10 million metric tons.

In 2006, the port's shipping traffic carried 9.9 million tons of goods.

Port operation

Source: World Bank; African Development Bank study on the transport sector

Other
The football (soccer) club ASC Port Autonome is named after port and the port co-owns the club.

The port features prominently in Senegalese cult-classic film Touki Bouki.

See also
Transport in Senegal
MV Le Joola
List of Senegalese companies

References

Further reading
R. J. Peterec, The Role of the Port of Dakar in Independent West Africa: A Study of the Effect of Independence Upon, Columbia University, 1966
Joseph-Clément Chappex, Le Port de Dakar, Dakar, University of Dakar, 1967, p. 240-28 p. (thesis)
Pierre Dumard, Dakar, port de commerce (Dakar, Port of Commerce) in Revue maritime (Maritime Review), no. 135, July 1957, p. 847-853
Monique Lakroum, Le Port de Dakar, étude économique et sociale de 1919 à 1939 (The Port of Dakar: Economic and Social Studies from 1919 to 1939), Université Paris-XII, 197?, p/ 176
André Saint-Laurent, Le Port de Dakar et son hinterland (The Port of Dakar and its Hinterland), Université de Montréal, 1975 (M.A.)
Tamsir Sylla, L’Impact du port dans l’urbanogénèse de la presqu’île du Cap-Vert, Dakar, université Cheikh Anta Diop, 1989, p. 94 
Ibrahima Thioub, Les Salariés africains du port de Dakar (situation économique et mouvements revendicatifs) de 1935 à 1939 (African Salaries at the Port of Dakar from 1935 to 1939), Dakar, University of Dakar, 1983, p. 32 (mémoire de DEA) 
The Port of Dakar, Port of Africa, Dakar, Africa Publishers, 1983, p. 44
The Port of Dakar, 1971, Journal de la Marine marchand, ep. 76, series of articles

News articles
"Le port de commerce de Dakar, escale active et saine" in the Bulletin d'information et de renseignements de l'Afrique occidentale française, no. 181, February 13, 1939, p. 79-82
"Le port de Dakar : travaux et projets" in the Bulletin d'information et de renseignements de l'Afrique occidentale française no. 212, January 31, 1938, p. 29-30
"Le port de Dakar" in L'Équipement de l'AOF. Aperçu des réalisations du FIDES, 1 July 1950, Paris, La Documentation française, 1950, 213 p.
"Le port de Dakar" in the Bulletin d'information de l'Afrique occidentale française, no. 65, August 31, 1950, p. 1-4 ; no. 66, September 7, 1950, p. 1-4
"Le port autonome de Dakar" in Sénégal d'aujourd'hui (Senegal Today), special edition, around 1973, p. 50-71

Map
Côte occidentale d'Afrique. Port et Mouillage de Dakar. Levés en 1875 ... par Mr F. Leclerc (Coast of West Africa), Paris, 1876 (carte conserved in the British Library)

External links

Official website
The Port of the Future, huge state projects at the APIX site

Companies of Senegal
Ports and harbours in Africa
Ports and harbours of the Atlantic Ocean
Transport in Senegal
Autonomous and independent ports